Ibón is the Aragonese term for small mountain lakes of glacial origin in the Pyrenees, generally above 2,000 m. Many of them are the source of watercourses in Aragon.

There are in total 94 ibóns of different shapes and sizes; some of them are used to feed small hydroelectric plants.

The ibóns of Anayet, Sabocos, Ip or Estanés are the most well-known.

Etymology 
ibón stems with almost certainty from the basque word ibai (river), which originally designated hot springs.

Geology 
As the terrain where lies the spring forms a basin, often caused by the ancient presence of a glacier, these waters form a large or small lake depending on the morphological characteristics of the area.

Mythology 
There are, according to local legend, enchanted Ibóns, where live fairies, like the Plan.

See also 
Lakes in the Pyrenees

Landforms of Aragon